The 1991 European Aquatics Championships was a water sport competition hosted in Athens, Greece from 18–25 August.

Medal table

Swimming

Men's events

Women's events

Open water swimming

 Held in Terracina, Italy from 14–15 September.

Men's events

Women's events

Diving

Men's events

Women's events

Synchronized swimming

Water polo

Men's event

Women's event

External links
Results on GBRSports

 
European Aquatics Championships, 1991
S
LEN European Aquatics Championships
Sports competitions in Athens
S
August 1991 sports events in Europe
20th century in Athens